Most Valuable Canadian or Canadian MVP may refer to:

 CFL's Most Outstanding Canadian Award, awarded to the best Canadian player in the Canadian Football League
 Grey Cup Most Valuable Canadian, best Canadian player in Canadian Football League championship game who receives the Dick Suderman Trophy